Philip or Phil Burton may refer to:

Phil Burton (born 1974), Australian musician
Philip Burton (musician), violist of the Griller Quartet
Phillip Burton (1926–1983), U.S. politician
Philip Burton (politician) (1910–1995), Irish politician, farmer, and auctioneer
Philip Burton (theatre director) (1904–1995), founder of the American Musical and Dramatic Academy
Philip Burton Jr. (1934–2010), American documentary filmmaker
Philip Lionel Burton (1914–1996), British civil servant